Roy Chubby Brown (born 3 February 1945) is an English stand-up comedian whose act consists of offensive humour, high profanity, forthright social commentary and outspoken disdain for political correctness.

Early life
Roy Chubby Brown (born Royston Vasey) Vasey, was born on 3rd February 1945 in Grangetown, Middlesbrough in the North Riding of Yorkshire and has a sister named Barbara. He left school without any qualifications, leaving home at the age of fourteen, spent time living rough and moving from job-to-job, at one point joining the Merchant Navy. He became homeless and for some time slept in a fishing boat in Redcar. He was arrested and taken to a detention centre and then on to Borstal, following that, went to jail." His style of stand-up comedy consists of offensive humour, high profanity, forthright social commentary and outspoken disdain for political correctness.

Whilst in prison, Vasey read I Owe Russia $1200 by Bob Hope, which made him decide he wanted to be a stand-up comic. When he saw Ken Dodd perform live, he thought he was so good it inspired him to try comedy himself.

Vasey formed a comedy duo with a fellow ex-Pipelines band member. The duo named themselves Alcock and Brown, as they shared surnames with the pilots of the first transatlantic flight, wearing goggles during their performance. The group eventually disbanded, with Vasey continuing as a comedic act by himself; however the goggles stayed, and became a permanent part of his image.

Vasey's manager at the time (1971) George Forster, asked him whether he would try performing blue comedy, to which he agreed. In 1971, he took to the stage and said, "Good evening! My wife's got two cunts and I'm one of them." Vasey has said he was nearly beaten up, but that following that performance: "I knew I had something. I took the building site mentality and banter and took it to the stage. I was the first person ever to say the 'C' word on stage in the UK. To be honest, I never looked back."

Career
Vasey appeared on the UK television talent show New Faces as Roy Chubby Brown in the 1970s, coming second to a country and western band. He failed the audition for another television talent show, Opportunity Knocks, after saying the word 'arse' during his interview.

Comedy
Brown's image is characterised by a clown-like stage costume consisting of a leather flying helmet and goggles, a white shirt, a red bow tie and moccasin slippers, and his trademark multi-coloured patchwork suit (previously made from beer mats because stag night crowds would shower him in beer).

His comedy is considered controversial due to its subject being: Blue comedy, insult comedy, political satire, sarcasm, self-deprecation, British politics, sex, celebrities, culture and one liners.

Film
In 1993, Brown released U.F.O., a science fiction film starring himself, Roger Lloyd-Pack and Sara Stockbridge. It was reviewed poorly, with Empire calling the film "a stand-up show, allowing the comedian to tell his sexist jokes to a race of aliens who charge him for being a misogynist" and rating it 1/5.  

In 2012, Brown voiced a talking lamppost in Robin Sheppard's film adaptation of Richard Milward's novel Apples. He also played the Victorian Photographer in the feature film Unconditional (titled Unconditional Love in the USA) directed by Bryn Higgins.

He eventually began to perform at larger venues, with his breakthrough coming in 1990, as Universal Pictures signed him to a home video contract, where he would release concerts annually every Christmas, eventually going on to sell 250,000 copies.

His most recent UK release was in 2019, and he continues to perform concerts in the United Kingdom, and occasionally overseas at British tourist destinations.

TV
Vasey appeared in the second series of The League of Gentlemen as the town's mayor. The fictional town where the characters were based had been named Royston Vasey from the start.

Brown's live shows are rarely seen on television; however, a programme about Brown called Roy Chubby Brown: Britain's Rudest Comedian was broadcast on Channel 4 in May 2007.

Music
One of his best-known songs is "Living Next Door to Alice (Who the Fuck is Alice?)", a cover version of "Living Next Door to Alice", recorded with Smokie. The record spent 27 weeks in the UK Singles Chart, selling 400,000 copies and peaking at number 3 in August 1995. He released a solo single in the winter of 1996 called "A Rocking Good Christmas", written by Ray Hedges; this reached number 51. Brown has also released two albums, Take Fat and Party (1995) and Fat Out of Hell (1996); they achieved positions 29 and 67 in the UK Albums Chart respectively.

Personal life
Vasey has seven children from three marriages. He met his current wife Helen in Scarborough in the late-1990s, and lives with her and their two children in Tetney, Lincolnshire.

Vasey was diagnosed with throat cancer in 2002 and had a vocal cord removed.

In 2006, he released an autobiography titled Common as Muck: The Autobiography of Roy 'Chubby' Brown. In December 2011, he self-published a collection of memoirs from his life and career called It's Funny Being Me.

Vasey is a supporter of Middlesbrough Football Club. He is a co-owner of the racehorse Rasaman.

In 2003, Vasey was fined £200 in Blackpool for assaulting a heckler by pulling him from his seat, dragging him across the floor and proceeding to attack him with a golf umbrella. Brown later claimed, "I just wanted the man to stop swearing and being abusive in front of women and children who were on the pier."

In 2014, Vasey was fined for reading The Sun newspaper whilst driving on the A19 road in North Yorkshire.

Stand up releases
While Brown has been performing for over 30 years, his live shows have been released around Christmas time since 1990. They have been released by Channel 5 Video Distribution (1990), PolyGram Video (1991–1998) and Universal Pictures (1999–present), they were released on VHS (1990–2005), DVD (2000–present) and Blu-ray (2010–2012). The release due for November 2011 was delayed until 2012 due to the venue, technical and timing issues.

Releases
 From Inside the Helmet (1990)
 The Helmet Rides Again (1991)
 The Helmet's Last Stand (1992)
U.F.O. (1993) [film]
 Roy Chubby Brown: Exposed (1993)
 Jingle Bollocks (1994)
 Clitoris Allsorts (1995)
 Saturday Night Beaver (1996)
 Obscene and Not Heard (1997)
 Chubby Goes Down Under and Other Sticky Regions (1998)
 You Fat Bastard! (1999)
Roy Chubby Brown's Comedy Box (2000) [Compilation]
 Thunder Bollocks (2000)
 Stocking Filler! (2001)
 Standing Room Only (2002)
 Bad Taste (2003)
 Giggling Lips (2004)
 King Thong (2005)
 Kick-Arse Chubbs (2006)
 The Good, The Bad And The Fat Bastard (2007)
Roy Chubby Brown's Tasty Threesome (2008) [Compilation]
 Dirty Weekend in Blackpool (2008)
Roy Chubby Brown: Mucky Man Box (2009) [Compilation]
 Too Fat To Be Gay (2009)
Roy Chubby Brown's Blue Christmas (2010) [Compilation]
 Pussy & Meatballs (2010)
 Front Page Boobs (2012)
 Who Ate All The Pies? (2013)
Roy Chubby Brown's Big Fat Bastard Box (2014) [Compilation]
 Don't Get Fit! Get Fat! (2014)
 Hangs Up His Helmet (2015)
 Great British Jerk Off (2016) [Documentary] 
 The Second Coming (2017)
 50 Shades of Brown (2019)
 Harmless Vulgarity And Friendly Smut (2022)

References

External links

https://www.roychubbybrown.biz/
 
 Reviews of Roy Chubby Brown in concert

1945 births
Living people
Comedians from Yorkshire
English male comedians
English stand-up comedians
English racehorse owners and breeders
People from Grangetown, North Yorkshire
People from Middlesbrough
Obscenity controversies in stand-up comedy
20th-century English comedians
21st-century English comedians